The 1991 Bud 500 was the 20th stock car race of the 1991 NASCAR Winston Cup Series and the 32nd iteration of the event. The race was held on Saturday, August 24, 1991, before an audience of 60,500 in Bristol, Tennessee, at Bristol Motor Speedway, a 0.533 miles (0.858 km) permanent oval-shaped racetrack. The race took the scheduled 500 laps to complete. At race's end, owner-driver Alan Kulwicki, after suffering a flat tire early into the race, would manage to mount a comeback and dominate the late stages of the race to take his third career NASCAR Winston Cup Series victory and his only victory of the season. To fill out the top three, Junior Johnson & Associates driver Sterling Marlin and Hendrick Motorsports driver Ken Schrader would finish second and third, respectively.

Background 

The Bristol Motor Speedway, formerly known as Bristol International Raceway and Bristol Raceway, is a NASCAR short track venue located in Bristol, Tennessee. Constructed in 1960, it held its first NASCAR race on July 30, 1961. Despite its short length, Bristol is among the most popular tracks on the NASCAR schedule because of its distinct features, which include extraordinarily steep banking, an all concrete surface, two pit roads, and stadium-like seating. It has also been named one of the loudest NASCAR tracks.

Entry list 

 (R) denotes rookie driver.

Qualifying 
Qualifying was split into two rounds. The first round was held on Friday, August 23, at 7:35 PM EST. Each driver would have one lap to set a time. During the first round, the top 15 drivers in the round would be guaranteed a starting spot in the race. If a driver was not able to guarantee a spot in the first round, they had the option to scrub their time from the first round and try and run a faster lap time in a second round qualifying run, held on Saturday, August 24, at 1:00 PM EST. As with the first round, each driver would have one lap to set a time. For this specific race, positions 15-30 would be decided on time, and depending on who needed it, a select amount of positions were given to cars who had not otherwise qualified on time but were high enough in owner's points; up to two provisionals were given. If needed, a past champion who did not qualify on either time or provisionals could use a champion's provisional, adding one more spot to the field.

Full qualifying results

Race results

Standings after the race 

Drivers' Championship standings

Note: Only the first 10 positions are included for the driver standings.

References 

1991 NASCAR Winston Cup Series
NASCAR races at Bristol Motor Speedway
August 1991 sports events in the United States
1991 in sports in Tennessee